98 Degrees (stylized as 98°) is the debut album by American male vocal group 98 Degrees. The album debuted and peaked at number 145 and number 88 on the U.S. Billboard 200 and Top R&B/Hip-Hop Albums respectively. The album sold over 500,000 copies in the U.S. alone.

Track listing

Original version

Re-released version
 The album was re-released on March 10, 1998, and "You Are Everything" was replaced with "Was It Something I Didn't Say", which was produced by Daryl Simmons.

Singles
 "Invisible Man", the first single from the group was released on June 24, 1997. The song managed to enter the top twenty of the Billboard Hot 100 peaking at number twelve.
 "Was It Something I Didn't Say" was the second and final single from the album and it was released on March 10, 1998. The song did not enjoy the success of the former single, but was able to help make the album reach Gold certification.

Charts

Weekly charts

Certifications

Credits

98°
Jeff Timmons ― vocals
Nick Lachey ― vocals
Justin Jeffre ― vocals
Drew Lachey ― vocals

References

1997 debut albums
98 Degrees albums
Motown albums
Albums produced by Richard Marx
Albums recorded at Chung King Studios

ko:98°